LeTua Cycling Team is a Malaysian UCI Continental cycling team managed by Yassin Shukor and sponsored by PanGlobal Insurance, PowerBar, Merpati, Castrol and Amerstrand Engineering.

Major wins 
2007
Stage 3 & 6 Jelajah Malaysia, Anuar Manan
Stage 3 Tour of Siam, Ahmad Haidar Anuawar
Stage 9 Azerbaijan Tour, Anuar Manan
Stage 3b Tour of Hong Kong, Ahmad Haidar Anuawar
Stage 2 Tour of Hainan, Anuar Manan
2008
Overall Jelajah Malaysia, Tonton Susanto
Stage 2, 3 & 5, Anuar Manan
Stage 1 Tour of East Java, Tonton Susanto
Stage 2 Malacca Cup, Anuar Manan
Stage 8 & 11 Tour of Indonesia, Mohamed Ridzuan Zainal
2009
Stage 4 Tour de Langkawi, Samai Samai
Stage 3 & 4 Tour de Hokkaido, Jaan Kirsipuu
 Singapore, Road Race Championship, Low Ji Wen
Stage 1 Herald Sun Tour, Jaan Kirsipuu
Stage 6 Tour of Southland, Jeremy Yates
2010
Stage 5 Jelajah Malaysia, Mark O'Brien

2011 squad

External links
 
 UCI.ch
 LeTua Cycling Team's 2007 Team List in Cycling Archives
 LeTua Cycling Team's 2008 Team List in Cycling Archives
 LeTua Cycling Team's 2009 Team List in Cycling Archives
 LeTua Cycling Team's 2010 Team List in Cycling Archives

UCI Continental Teams (Asia)
Cycling teams based in Malaysia
Cycling teams established in 2004
2004 establishments in Malaysia